Bird provides radio frequency communication products, services, calibration and training for the semiconductor, public security, cellular networks, broadcasting, military, government and medical industries.

Bird's product portfolio includes RF power sensors, RF power meters, wattmeters, spectrum analyzers, antenna and cable testers,  attenuators, RF terminations and loads, cellular repeaters, signal boosters, RF IQC recording solutions, RF signal generation, and RF software analysis tools.

History
In 1942 James Raymond Bird teamed up with a college friend to start a small job shop in Cleveland, Ohio which led to the development of a line of products used to measure RF power generated by television and radio transmitters. James and his partner founded the Bird Engineering Company which later changed its name to the Bird Electronic Corporation. During his career, James Bird had been awarded several patents.

Bird acquired TX RX Systems in 1995.

Bird acquired X-COM Systems in 2010, the company designs and manufactures digital communication hardware and software for military and commercial applications.

Milestones and patents
2018  Combilent US Acquires Bird's Radio Infrastructure Products Division

2017  Bird Launches the SignalHawk SH-42S Handheld Spectrum Analyzer

2013  Bird Technologies Acquires Distributed Antenna System Manufacturer DeltaNode

2013  VSG5000A Multi-Channel Phase Coherent Vector Signal Generator launched

2013  IQC5000A Series, RF Spectrum Capture and Playback System launched

2013  X-COM Systems releases Spectro-X 4.0 Signal Analysis Toolkit

2012  X-COM Systems releases Version 3.0 of RF Editor Graphical RF Signal Editor Software

2010  Bird Technologies Group Acquires X-COM Systems for Its Advanced RF Military Technology

2009  Radio Magazine Pick Hits Awarded at NAB Show for PC SignalHawk

2008  Radio Magazine Pick Hits Awarded at NAB Show for Transmit Power Monitor

2007  Ohio Governor's "E" Excellence in exporting award received (2nd time)

2005  Radio Magazine Pick Hits Awarded at NAB Show for Broadcast Power Monitor (BPME)

2003  Radio World Cool Stuff Awarded to Bird Site Analyzer

1999  Antenna Tester patent granted

1959  Thruline power measurement patent granted

Model 43 Thruline Directional Wattmeter

The Bird Model 43 Thruline Wattmeter was created in the early 1950s. The self-contained instrument uses microwatts of energy from the transmission it measured. Its reference line section made it economical and provided built-in reference accuracy that remained consistent with age. The patent was granted for the Directional Wattmeter in 1958.

References

External links
 www.birdrf.com

Electronic test equipment manufacturers